Patrick Pascal (born 24 December 1974 in Bauchi)  is a former Nigerian footballer, who is currently the Super Eagles team coordinator and chairman Bauchi Football Association

Club career 
Patrick started his career In 1992, he started his professional career in the Nigerian Premier League for Wikki Tourist. After a year in Bauchi, he moved to Shooting Stars FC, After scoring 43 goals in 103 appearances, he join Turkish club Gençlerbirliği Ankara in 1996,There he remained until 18 November 1997 and then signed with Altay Izmir. Scoring 20 goals in 45 appearances to move them out relegation. After the season, In January 2000,he return to Belgium and signed for Royal Antwerp after a successful trial. In December 2000 Pascal Join Lifan F.C. In China and retire in 2002

International career 
Patrick played in 1998 and 1999 in four internationals for the Nigerian national football team. Patrick Pascal was part of the Nigeria Olympic team that won gold medal in Atlanta 1996.

Career as a functionary 

After the end of his active career he became president of Wikki Tourists football club. He practiced this job out to the spring of 2012  and was then "Special Assistant" for the youth teams of the Nigeria Football Federation. Additionally, he works as a "head of youth work"  of the Bauchi Football Association, He’s first vice-chairman of Bauchi FA and worked as Special Assistant on youth development under the Aminu Maigari administration and was a member of the Technical Committee under Pinnick Amaju, currently he is the coordinator of super eagles of Nigeria.

Honours

Club 
Shooting Star

 Nigeria Premier League 1995
 Challenge Cup  1995
 African Cup Of Champion Club Runner Up 1996

International

Nigeria Youth

Olympic Gold Medal: 1996
All African Games 1995 Bronze Medal

References

External links 

Pascal Patrick  At Soccerway

Nigerian footballers
1974 births
Living people
Association football utility players
Nigeria international footballers
People from Bauchi State